This is a list of state leaders in the 11th century (1001–1100) AD, of the Holy Roman Empire.

Main

Holy Roman Empire, Kingdom of Germany (complete list, complete list) –
Otto III, Holy Roman Emperor (996–1002), King (983–1002)
Henry II, Holy Roman Emperor (1014–1024), King (1002–1024)
Conrad II, Holy Roman Emperor (1027–1039), King (1024–1039)
Henry III, Holy Roman Emperor (1046–1056), King (1028–1056)
Henry IV, Holy Roman Emperor (1084–1105), King (1053–1087)
Conrad II of Italy, King (1087–1098)
Henry V, Holy Roman Emperor (1111–1125), King (1099–1125)

Austrian

Margraviate of Austria (complete list) –
Henry I, Margrave (994–1018)
Adalbert, Margrave (1018–1055)
Ernest, Margrave (1055–1075)
Leopold II, Margrave (1075–1095)
Leopold III, Margrave (1095–1136)

County of Bregenz (complete list) –
Ulrich IX, Count (1043–pre-1079)
Ulrich X, Couint (1079–1097)
Rudolf I, Couint (1097–1160)

Prince-Bishopric of Brixen (complete list) –
Hartwig, Prince-bishop (1027–1039)
Poppo de Curagnoni, Prince-bishop (1039–1048)
Altwin, Prince-bishop (1049–1097)
Burkhard, Prince-bishop (1091–1099)
Anto/Anzo, Prince-bishop (1097–1100)
Hugo, Prince-bishop (1100–1125)

Duchy of Carinthia (complete list) –
Henry III, Duke (995–1002)
Otto I, Duke (978–985, 1002–1004)
Conrad I, Duke (1004–1011)
Adalbero, Duke (1011–1035)
Conrad II, Duke (1036–1039)
Henry IV, Duke (1039–1047)
Welf, Duke (1047–1055)
Conrad III, Duke (1056–1061)
Berthold II, Duke (1061–1077)
Luitpold, Duke (1077–1090)
Henry IV, Duke (1090–1122)

Hungarian March –
Liutpold, Margrave (1043)
Siegfried I, Margrave (1045–1048/1065)

Landgraviate of Sundgau –
Otto I of Habsburg, Count (?–1046)

March of Styria (complete list) –
Adalbero of Eppenstein, Margrave (c.1000–1035)
Arnold, Margrave (1035–1055)
Godfrey, co-Margrave (1042–1050)
Ottokar I, Margrave (1056–1075)
Adalbero, Margrave (1075–1082)
Ottokar II, Margrave (1082–1122)

Prince-Bishopric of Trent (complete list) –
Ulrich II, Prince-bishop (1027–1055) 
Azzo, Prince-bishop (1055–1065)
Henry I, Prince-bishop (1068–1082)
Bernard II, Prince-bishop (1082–1084)
Adalberon, Prince-bishop (1084–1106)

Bavarian

Duchy of Bavaria (complete list) –
Henry IV, Duke (995–1004, 1009–1017)
Henry V, Duke (1004–1009, 1017–1026)
Henry VI, Duke (1026–1042)
Henry VII, Duke (1042–1047)
Conrad I, Duke (1049–1053)
Henry VIII, Duke (1053–1054, 1055–1061)
Conrad II, Duke (1054–1055)
Otto of Nordheim, Duke (1061–1070)
Welf I, Duke (1070–1077, 1096–1101)
Henry VIII, Duke (1077–1096)

Prince-Abbey of Niedermünster (complete list) –
Uda I von Kirchberg, Abbess (1002–1025)
Heilka I von Rothenburg, Abbess (1025–1052)
Gertrud I von Hals, Abbess (1052–1065)
Mathilde I von Luppurg, Abbess (1065–1070)
Heilka II von Franken, Abbess (1070–1089)
Uda II von Marburg, Abbess (1089–1103)

Margraviate of the Nordgau (complete list) –
Henry of Schweinfurt, Margrave (994–1004)
Otto of Schweinfurt, Margrave (1024–1031)
Diepold II, Margrave (?–1078)
Diepold III, Margrave (1093–1146)

Pappenheim (complete list) –
Henry I, Lord (c.1030–?)
Henry II, Lord (late 11th century)

Prince-Bishopric of Passau (complete list) –
Christian, Prince-Bishop (991–1013)
Berengar, Prince-Bishop (1013–1045)
Egilbert, Prince-Bishop (1045–1065)
Altmann, Prince-Bishop (1065–1091)
Hermann of Eppenstein, counter-bishop (1085–1087)
Ulrich, Prince-Bishop (1092–1121)

Bohemia

Duchy of Bohemia (complete list) –
Boleslaus III the Redhead, Duke (999–1002, 1003)
Vladivoj, Duke (1002–1003)
Boleslaus the Brave, Duke (1003–1004)
Jaromír, Duke (1004–1012, 1033–1034)
Oldřich, Duke (1012–1033, 1034)
Bretislav I, Duke (1034–1055)
Spytihněv II, Duke (1055–1061)
Vratislaus II, Duke (1061–1085), King (1085–1092)
Conrad I, Duke (1092)
Bretislaus II, Duke (1092–1100)
Bořivoj II, Duke (1100–1107, 1117–1120)

Burgundian-Low Countries

Kingdom of Burgundy (Arles) (complete list) –
For the preceding rulers of Burgundy/Arles, see List of state leaders in the 11th century#Europe: West
Conrad II, King (1032–1039)
Henry III, King (1038–1056)
Henry IV, King (1056–1105)

Upper Burgundy (complete list) –
Rudolph III, King (993–1032)

County of Burgundy (complete list) –
Otto-William, Count (982–1026), Duke (1002–1004)
Reginald I, Count (1026–1057)
William I the Great, Count (1057–1087)
Reginald II, Count (1087–1097)
William II the German, Count (1097–1125)

Landgraviate of Brabant (complete list) –
Godfrey I, Landgrave (1095–1139)
Henry III, Landgrave (1085/1086–1095)
Godfrey I, Landgrave (1095–1139)

County of Flanders (complete list) –
Baldwin IV the Bearded, Count (988–1037)
Baldwin V of Lille, Count (1037–1067)
Baldwin VI, Count (1067–1070)
Arnulf III, Count (1070–1071)
Robert I the Frisian, Count (1071–1093)
Robert II, Count (1093–1111)

County of Frisia / County of Holland (complete list) –
Dirk III, Count (993–1039)
Dirk IV, Count (1039–1049)
Floris I, Count (1049–1061)
Gertrude of Saxony, Regent (1061–1067)
Robert, Regent (1067–?)
Dirk V, Count (1061–1091)
Floris II, Count (1091–1121)

County of Hainaut (complete list) –
Herman, Count (1039–c.1049), Count of reunited Hainaut (c.1049)
Richilde, Countess of Hainaut, Countess (c.1050–1076)
Baldwin I, Count (1051–1070)
Arnulf III, Count, disputed (1070–1071)
Baldwin II, Count (1071–c.1098)
Baldwin III, Count (1098–1120)

County of Limburg (complete list) –
Waleran I, Count (1065–1082)
Henry I, Count (1082–1119)

Duchy of Lower Lorraine (complete list) –
Otto, Duke (991–1012)
Godfrey II, Duke (1012–1023)
Gothelo I, Duke (1023–1044), of Upper Lorraine (1033–1044)
Gothelo II, Duke (1044–1046)
Frederick, Duke (1046–1065)
Godfrey the Bearded, Duke (1044–1047), of Lower Lorraine (1065–1069)
Godfrey IV, Duke (1069–1076)
Conrad II, Duke (1076–1087)
Godfrey V, Duke (1087–1100)

County of Mons (complete list) –
Reginar IV, Count (973–974, 998–1013)
Reginar V, Count (1013–1039)
Herman, Count (1039–c.1049), Count of reunited Hainaut (c.1049)

County of Namur (complete list) –
Albert I, Count (c.981–1011)
Robert II, Count (1010–c.1018)
Albert II, Count (c.1018–1063)
Albert III, Count (1063–1102)

County of Valenciennes (complete list) –
Baldwin IV, Count (988–1035)
Baldwin V, Count (1035–1045)

Franconian

County of Castell (complete list) –
Rupert I, Count (1200–1223)

Electoral Rhenish

Archbishopric of Cologne (complete list) –
Heribert, Prince-Archbishop (999–1021)
Pilgrim, Prince-Archbishop (1021–1036)
Hermann II, Prince-Archbishop (1036–1056)
Anno II, Prince-Archbishop (1056–1075)
Hildholf, Prince-Archbishop (1076–1078)
Sigwin, Prince-Archbishop (1078–1089)
Hermann III, Prince-Archbishop (1089–1099)
Friedrich I, Prince-Archbishop (1100–1131)

Prince-Bishopric of Mainz (complete list) –
Willigis, Prince-archbishop (975–1011)
Erkanbald, Prince-archbishop (1011–1021)
Aribo, Prince-archbishop (1021–1031)
Bardo, Prince-archbishop (1031–1051)
Luitpold, Prince-archbishop (1051–1059)
Siegfried I, Prince-archbishop (1060–1084)
Wezilo, Prince-archbishop (1084–1088)
Rudhart, Prince-archbishop (1088–1109)

County Palatine of Lotharingia (complete list) –
Ezzo, Count (996–1034)
Otto I of Lotharingia, Count (1034–1045)
Heinrich I of Lotharingia, Count (1045–1061)
Hermann II of Lotharingia, Count (1061–1085)

County Palatine of the Rhine (complete list) –
Henry of Laach, Count (1085/1087–1095)
Siegfried of Ballenstedt, Count (1095–1113)

Elector-Bishopric of Trier (complete list) –
Ludolf, Prince-bishop (994–1008)
Megingod, Prince-bishop (1008–1015)
Poppo von Babenberg, Prince-bishop (1016–1047)
Eberhard, Prince-bishop (1047–1066)
Kuno I von Wetterau, Prince-bishop (1066–1066)
Udo von Wetterau, Prince-bishop (1066–1078)
Egilbert, Prince-bishop (1079–1101)

Lower Rhenish–Westphalian

Duchy of Cleves (complete list) –
Dietrich I, Count (1092–1119)

Essen Abbey (complete list) –
Mathilde II, Princess-Abbess (971–1011)
Sophia, Princess-Abbess (1012–1039)
Theophanu, Princess-Abbess (1039–1058)
Svanhild, Princess-Abbess (1058–1085)
Lutgarde, Princess-Abbess (c.1088–1118)

County of Guelders (complete list) –
Gerard I, Count (pre-1096–c.1129)

Prince-Bishopric of Liège (complete list) –
Notger, Prince-Bishop (972–1008)
Baldrick II, Prince-Bishop (1008–1018)
Wolbodo, Prince-Bishop (1018–1021)
Durandus, Prince-Bishop (1021–1025)
Reginard, Prince-Bishop (1025–1037)
Nithard, Prince-Bishop (1037–1042)
Wazo, Prince-Bishop (1042–1048)
Theodwin, Prince-Bishop (1048–1075)
Henry of Verdun, Prince-Bishop (1075–1091)
Otbert, Prince-Bishop (1091–1119)

County of Luxemburg (complete list) –
Henry I, Count (998–1026)
Henry II, Count (1026–1047)
Giselbert, Count (1047–1059)
Conrad I, Count (1059–1086)
Henry III, Count (1086–1096)
William I, Count (1096–1131)

Prince-Bishopric of Utrecht (complete list) –
Adalbold II, Prince-bishop (1024–1026)
Bernold, Prince-bishop (1026/27–1054)
William I (1054–1076)
Conrad, Prince-bishop (1076–1099)
Burchard, Prince-bishop (1100–1112)

County of Wied (complete list) –
Richwin IV, Count (1093–1112)
Matfried III, Count (1093–1129)

Upper Rhenish

County of Bar (complete list) –
Theodoric I, Count (978–1026/1027)
Frederick II, Count (1019–1026)
Frederick III, Count (1027–1033)
Sophia, Countess (1033–1093), and Louis of Montbéliard, Count (1038–1071)
Theodoric II, Count (1093–1105)

Prince-Bishopric of Basel (complete list) –
Ulrich II, Prince-bishop (1032–1040)
Bruno, Prince-bishop (1040)
Theodorich, Prince-bishop (1041–1055)
Berengar von Wetterau, Prince-bishop (1055–1072)
Burchard of Basle, Prince-bishop (1072–1105)

Duchy of Upper Lorraine (complete list) –
Theodoric I, Duke (978–c.1027)
Frederick II, co-Duke (1019–1026)
Frederick III, co-Duke (1026–1033)
Gothelo the Great, Duke of Lower Lorraine (1023–1044), of Upper Lorraine (1033–1044)
Godfrey III the Bearded, Duke (1044–1047), of Lower Lorraine (1065–1069)
Adalbert, Duke (1047–1048)
Gerard, Duke (1048–1070)
Theodoric II, Duke (1070–1115)

County of Nassau-Saarbrücken (complete list) –
Siegbert, Count (1080–1105)

Salm (complete list) –
Giselbert, Count (1019–1059)
Herman I, Count (1059–1088)
Andrea II, Count (1088–1138)

Prince-Bishopric of Sion (complete list) –
Hugues, Prince-Bishop (993/4–1018/20)
Aymon of Savoy, Prince-Bishop (1034–1053/4)
Ermenfroi, Prince-Bishop (1054–1087-1090)
Gausbertus, Prince-Bishop (fl.1092)

Prince-Bishopric of Speyer (complete list) –
Ruprecht, Prince-bishop (987–1004)
Walter, Prince-bishop (1004–1031)
Siegfried I, Prince-bishop (1031–1032)
Reinher, Prince-bishop (1032–1033)
Reginhard II of Dillingen, Prince-bishop (1033–1039)
Sigbodo I, Prince-bishop (1039–1051)
Arnold I of Falkenberg, Prince-bishop (1051–1056)
Konrad I, Prince-bishop (1056–1060)
Eginhard II of Katzenelnbogen, Prince-bishop (1060–1067)
Heinrich of Scharfenberg, Prince-bishop (1067–1072/1073)
Rüdiger Hutzmann, Prince-bishop (1073–1090)
Johann I of Kraichgau, Prince-bishop (1090–1104)

Prince-Bishopric of Strasbourg (complete list) –
Alawich II, Prince-Bishop (999–1001)
Werner I von Habsburg, Prince-Bishop (1001–1028)
William I, Prince-Bishop (1028/29–1047)
Wizelin (Hezilo), Prince-Bishop (1048–1065)
Werner II von Achalm, Prince-Bishop (1065–1079)
Theobald, Prince-Bishop (1079–1084)
Otto von Büren, Prince-Bishop (1085–1100)
Balduin, Prince-Bishop (1100)
Kuno, Prince-Bishop (1100–1123)

Prince-Bishopric of Worms (complete list) –
Burchard I, Prince-bishop (1000–1025)
Azecho, Prince-bishop (1025–1044)
Adalgar, Prince-bishop (1044)
Arnold I, Prince-bishop (1044–1065)
Adalbert I von Rheinfelden, Prince-bishop (1065–1070)
Adalbert II of Saxony, Prince-bishop (1070–1107)

Lower Saxon

Duchy of Saxony (complete list) –
Bernard I, Duke (973–1011)
Bernard II, Duke (1011–1059)
Ordulf, Duke (1059–1072)
Magnus, Duke (1072–1106

Gandersheim Abbey (complete list) –
Gerberga II, Princess-Abbess (949–1001)
Sophie I, Princess-Abbess (1001–1039)
Adelheid I, Princess-Abbess (1039–1043)
Beatrice I, Princess-Abbess (1044–1061)
Adelheid II, Princess-Abbess (1061–1096)
Adelheid III, Princess-Abbess (1096–1104)

Obotrites (complete list) –
Mstislav, Prince (996–1018)
Udo, Prince (1018–1028)
Ratibor, Prince (1028–1043)
Gottschalk, Prince (1043–1066)
Budivoj, Prince (1066, 1069)
Kruto, Prince (1066-1069, 1069-1093)
Henry, Prince (1093–1127)

Upper Saxon

County of Anhalt (complete list) –
Esico, Count (c.1030–1060)
Adalbert, Count (1060–1076/83)
Otto I the Rich, Count (1076/83–1123)

Eastern March (complete list) –
Gero II, Margrave (993–1015)
Thietmar, Margrave (1015–1030)
Odo II, Margrave (1030–1046)
Bolesław I of Poland, Margrave (1002–1025)
Mieszko II of Poland, Margrave (1025–1031)
Dedi I, Margrave (1046–1075)
Dedi II, Margrave (fl.1069)
Henry I, Margrave (1075–1103)

Margravate of Meissen (complete list) –
Eckard I, Margrave (985–1002)
Gunzelin, Margrave (1002–1009)
Herman I, Margrave (1009–1031)
Eckard II, Margrave (1031–1046)
William, Margrave (1046–1062)
Otto I, Margrave (1062–1067)
Egbert I, Margrave (1067–1068)
Egbert II, Margrave (1068–1089)
Vratislaus II of Bohemia, Margrave (1076–1089)
Henry I, Margrave (1089–1103)

Northern March (complete list) –
Lothair I, Margrave (983–1003)
Werner, Margrave (1003–1009)
Bernard, Margrave (1009–1051)
William, Margrave (1051–1056)
Otto, Margrave (1056–1057)
Lothair Udo I, Margrave (1056–1057)
Lothair Udo II, Margrave (1057–1082)
Henry I the Long, Margrave (1082–1087)
Lothair Udo III, Margrave (1087–1106)

Duchy of Pomerania (complete list) –
Siemomysł, non-dynastic Duke (post–1000–1046)
Świętobor, non-dynastic Duke (1060–1106)

Duchy of Pomerelia (complete list) –
Świętobor, Duke (c.1100)

Duchy of Thuringia (complete list) –
Eckard I, Duke (1000–1002)
William II, Duke (1002–1003)
Louis the Bearded, Landgrave (1031–1056)
William IV, Duke (1046–1062)
Louis the Springer, Count (1056–1123)
Otto, Duke (1062–1067)
Egbert II, Duke (1067–1090)

Swabian

Duchy of Swabia (complete list) –
Herman II, Duke (997–1003)
Herman III, Duke (1003–1012)
Ernest I, Duke (1012–1015)
Ernest II, Duke (1015–1030)
Herman IV, Duke (1030–1038)
Henry I, Duke (1038–1045)
Otto II, Duke (1045–1048)
Otto III, Duke (1048–1057)
Rudolf I, Duke (1057–1079)
Berthold I, contested Duke (1079–1090)
Berthold II, contested Duke (1092–1098)
Frederick I, contested Duke (1079–1105)

Prince-Bishopric of Augsburg (complete list) –
Siegfried I, Prince-bishop (1001–1006)
Bruno, Prince-bishop (1006–1029)
Eberhard I, Prince-bishop (1029–1047)
Henry II, Prince-bishop (1047–1063)
Embrico, Prince-bishop (1063–1077)
Wigolt, Prince-bishop (1077–1088)
Siegfried II, Prince-bishop (1088–1096)
Hermann of Vohburg, Prince-bishop (1096–1133)

Margraviate of Baden (complete list) –
Herman II, Margrave (1073–1130)

Ellwangen Abbey (complete list) –
Ruadhoc, Prince-abbot (c.1020)
Berengar, Prince-abbot (?–1028)
Otbert, Prince-abbot (?–1035)
Richard, Prince-abbot (1035–?)
Arn, Prince-abbot (1046–1052 (1061?))
Reginger, Prince-abbot (1061–1076?)
Udo, Prince-abbot (1076–1082?)
Isambert, Prince-abbot (c.1090)
Adalger, Prince-abbot (c.1100)

Princely Abbey of Kempten (complete list) –
Otenus, Prince-abbot (1062–1064)
Heinrich I Dornstich of Alt-Ravensburg, Prince-abbot (1064–1073)
Konrad II Neubrunner, Prince-abbot (1073–1075)
Adalbert II, Prince-abbot (1078–1089)
Eberhard II, Prince-abbot (1089–1092)
Ulrich II Lindagrun of Ochsenbach, Prince-abbot (1092–1094)
Eberhard III, Prince-abbot (1094–1105)

County of Württemberg (complete list) –
Conrad I, Count (pre-1081–1110)

Italy

Kingdom of Italy (complete list) –
Ottonian dynasty
Otto III, King (996–1002)
Arduin of Ivrea, King (1002–1014)
Henry II, King (1004–1024)
Salian dynasty
Conrad II (Holy Roman Emperor), King (1026–1039)
Henry III, King (1039–1056)
Henry IV, King (1056–1105)
Conrad II of Italy, King (1093–1098)
Henry V, King (1098–1125)

March of Istria –
Poppo I, Margrave (1012–1044)
Ulric I, Margrave (1060–1070), son of Margrave Poppo I, also Margrave of Carniola
Henry I, Margrave (1077–1090)
Engelbert I, Margrave (1090–1096)
Burchard, Margrave (1093–1101)
Poppo II, Margrave (1096–1098)
Ulric II, Margrave (1098–1107)

March of Montferrat (complete list) –
William III, Margrave (991–1042)

County of Orange (complete list) –
Raimbaut I, Count (?)
, Count (c.1062)

Papal States (complete list) –
Sylvester II, Pope (999–1003)
John XVII, Pope (1003)
John XVIII, Pope (1003–1009)
Sergius IV, Pope (1009–1012)
Benedict VIII, Pope (1012–1024)
John XIX, Pope (1024–1032)
Benedict IX, Pope (1032–1044)
Sylvester III, Pope (1045)
Benedict IX, Pope (1045)
Gregory VI, Pope (1045–1046)
Clement II, Pope (1046–1047)
Benedict IX, Pope (1047–1048)
Damasus II, Pope (1048)
Leo IX, Pope (1049–1054)
Victor II, Pope (1055–1057)
Stephen IX, Pope (1057–1058)
Nicholas II, Pope (1058–1061)
Alexander II, Pope (1061–1073)
Gregory VII, Pope (1073–1085)
Victor III, Pope (1086–1087)
Urban II, Pope (1088–1099)
Paschal II, Pope (1099–1118)

Republic of Venice (complete list) – 
Pietro II Orseolo, Doge (991–1009)

County of Savoy (complete list) –
Humbert I the White-Handed, Count (1003–1047/48)
Amadeus I of the Tail, Count (1030/48–1051/56)
Otto I, Count (1051/56–1060)
Peter I, Count (1060–1078)
Amadeus II, Count (1078–1080)
Humbert II the Fat, Count (1082/91–1103)

March of Tuscany (complete list) – 
Hugh, Margrave (961–1001)
Boniface, Margrave (1004–1011)
Rainier, Margrave (1014–1027)
Boniface III, Margrave (1027–1052)
Frederick, Margrave (1052–1055)
Godfrey III, Margrave (1065–1069)
Godfrey IV, Margrave (1069–1076)
Matilda, Margravine (1076–1115)

References 

11th century
 
-
11th century in the Holy Roman Empire
11th-century people of the Holy Roman Empire